Tung Wah Group of Hospitals Yau Tze Tin Memorial College is an aided secondary school in Hong Kong. Fully subsidized by Government of Hong Kong, the day school is located in Siu Hong Court, Tuen Mun, New Territories. The grammar school is the tenth secondary school established by Tung Wah Group of Hospitals, the oldest and largest charitable organization of Hong Kong, in 1982.

See also 
 Tung Wah Group of Hospitals
 Education in Hong Kong
 List of secondary schools in Hong Kong
 List of schools in Hong Kong

References

External links 
Tung Wah Group of Hospitals Yau Tsz Tin Memorial College (in Chinese)
Tung Wah Group of Hospitals
School Profile

Yau Tze Tin Memorial College
Yau Tze Tin Memorial College
Educational institutions established in 1982
Secondary schools in Hong Kong
1982 establishments in Hong Kong
Tuen Mun